Radio y Televisión de Andalucía (RTVA) is the public radio and television broadcaster of the Spanish Autonomous Community of  Andalusia.

About RTVA 
Radio y Television de Andalucia (RTVA) is a provider of radio and TV in the south of Spain. It is a corporate public agency belonging to the Autonomous Government of Andalusia. Its origins go back to 1988 and 1989, when Canal Sur Radio and Canal Sur Televisión started broadcasting.

RTVA began satellite broadcasting in February 1996.

New stations were launched between 1996 and 1998, including Canal 2 Andalucía (now named Canal Sur 2), the second terrestrial television channel; Andalucía Televisión (trademark name of the satellite broadcasting), Radio Andalucía Información, Canal Fiesta Radio and the Fundación Audiovisual de Andalucía.

In December 2021, RTVA began to operate 'CanalSurMás' (a streaming video on demand platform) in testing mode.

Broadcasting

Television 

The international channel of Canal Sur Television is available through the Internet and various satellites and payment platforms in Spain and Europe.

Radio 
Canal Sur Radio (October 1988)
Radio Andalucía Información (September 1998)
Canal Fiesta Radio (January 2001)
Flamenco Radio (September 2008)

References

External links 
RTVA website

 
Mass media in Andalusia
Spanish radio networks
Television networks in Spain
FORTA
Publicly funded broadcasters
State media
Television channels and stations established in 1988
Mass media companies established in 1988
1988 establishments in Spain